Rodolfo Sacco (21 November 1923 – 21 March 2022) was an Italian legal scholar.

Biography
Born in Fossano, Italy, he was professor emeritus at the University of Turin, Faculty of Law. He is arguably one of the country's best known legal scholars and one of Europe's most famous comparative lawyers. 

Sacco continued to teach and publish extensively on the topics of comparative law, legal harmonization and private law. He has authored numerous articles in the leading French and American journals. He has served as the President of the Latin Group of the International Academy of Comparative Law, he is particularly well known as a civilian scholar in the French tradition. However, his international reputation is that of one of the founding fathers of the rich comparative law tradition that is now dominant in European circles.  Sacco has also served as the President of the International Association of Legal Science (UNESCO).

Sacco died on 21 March 2022, at the age of 98.

See also
 University of Turin, Faculty of Law
 Comparative Law

References

External links
 Rodolfo Sacco at Istituto Piemontese per la Storia della Resistenza e della Società Contemporanea

1923 births
2022 deaths
20th-century Italian jurists
Italian legal scholars
People from Fossano
Academic staff of the University of Turin
Members of the Lincean Academy